Homalopsycha is a genus of moths belonging to the family Tineidae.

Species
Homalopsycha pericharacta Meyrick, 1924
Homalopsycha rapida (Meyrick, 1909) (=Homalopsycha aestuaria Meyrick, 1920)

References

Myrmecozelinae